Nenney Shuhaidah Binti Shamsuddin (born c. 1975) is a Malaysian lawyer who has served as a Syariah High Court judge in Selangor since 2016. She and Noor Huda Roslan are the only two female Syariah High Court judges in Malaysia.

Shamsuddin has received international coverage for overseeing polygamy and khalwat cases. She has stated that sharia law, especially in polygamy cases, "exists to protect women's rights".

Legal career 
Shamsuddin worked at a legal aid bureau for three years before leaving to work for the Putrajayan judicial system. She worked in the attorney-general's department until 2016.  In 2016, she was appointed as a judge in the Mayasian Syariah court system. She and Roslan both became the first women appointed to the court's higher circuit.

Personal life 
Shamsuddin has three children. She attended the National University of Malaysia, where she received degrees in Islamic studies and psychology and a diploma in the administration of the Islamic Judiciary and Syariah.

Awards 
In 2018, Shamsuddin was named as one of BBC's 100 Women. She was the only Malaysian women featured that year.

References 

BBC 100 Women
Living people
21st-century Malaysian judges
National University of Malaysia alumni
1970s births
Malaysian Muslims
Women scholars of Islam
Malaysian women lawyers
Sharia lawyers